Rose Farm may refer to:

in the United States

 Rose Farm, Ohio
 Rose Farm, also known as the William L. Holmes House, Oregon City, Oregon